Emmanuel Isaneez (born 25 December 1986 in Jinja) is a Ugandan cricketer who played in the 2005 ICC Trophy in Ireland. In May 2019, he was named in Uganda's squad for the Regional Finals of the 2018–19 ICC T20 World Cup Africa Qualifier tournament in Uganda. He made his Twenty20 International (T20I) debut for Uganda against Botswana on 20 May 2019.

In July 2019, he was one of twenty-five players named in the Ugandan training squad, ahead of the Cricket World Cup Challenge League fixtures in Hong Kong.

References

1986 births
Living people
Ugandan cricketers
Uganda Twenty20 International cricketers